New Century Global Center is a multipurpose building in the Tianfu New Area of Chengdu, Sichuan, China and is the world's largest building in terms of floor area. It is served by Line 1 of the Chengdu Metro.

Size
The 100 meter (328 feet) tall structure is 500 by 400 m (1,640 by 1,312 ft) in size with 1,700,000 square meters (nearly 18,300,000 square feet) of floor space, making it the world's largest building measured by floor space.

Development
Developed by billionaire Deng Hong's Entertainment and Travel Group (ETG), nearly 400,000 square meters (over 4,300,000 square feet) of the building is devoted to shopping. It also houses offices, conference rooms, a university complex, two commercial centers, hotels, an IMAX cinema, a "Mediterranean village", a pirate ship and an Olympic-size skating rink. The centerpiece of the building is a water park ("Paradise Island Water Park"), containing a 5,000 square meter (nearly 54,000 square foot) artificial beach, where a giant 150 by 40 meter (492 by 131 feet) screen forms the horizon to offer sunrises and sunsets. At night, a stage extends out over the pool for concerts. A stand has been built overlooking the pool with a food court and entrance underneath at the floor level. The new InterContinental Hotel will feature 1,009 rooms that are spread over 6 by 8 story blocks around the edge of the complex. The center is connected to Line 1 of the Chengdu Metro.

The building will eventually face the Chengdu Contemporary Arts Center, designed by Iraqi-British architect Zaha Hadid.

Controversy
Although parts of the shopping area opened in early 2013, the center was supposed to have formally opened in March 2013 when it hosted the Global Fortune 500 conference. However, the businessman behind the project, Deng Hong, was arrested on corruption charges, and "given the potential for political humiliation," the conference was moved to the Shangri-La Hotel in Chengdu.

The opening was delayed until 22 August 2013, but was then scaled back after the arrest of more than 50 local government officials being detained in a series of overlapping investigations.

See also
List of largest buildings
New Century Global Center (Hong Kong)

References

External links

 Paradise Island Water Park
 Global Center —— TO SEE THE WORLD AND TO ATTRACT THE WORLD

Buildings and structures in Chengdu
Commercial buildings completed in 2013
Corruption in China
2013 establishments in China